Julio Daniel dos Santos Rodríguez (born 7 May 1983) is a Paraguayan retired footballer who last played for Presidente Hayes. 

He played usually in the hole-position, and sometimes as a second striker.

Club career
Born in Asunción, Dos Santos started his professional career with Cerro Porteño, before eventually moving to FC Bayern Munich of Germany, in January 2006. He was elected Paraguayan Footballer of the Year in 2005 by national newspaper Diario ABC Color. Upon his arrival in Munich, he was touted as a long-term successor to Michael Ballack, but faced stiff competition from Iran's Ali Karimi. Eventually, both players struggled to break into the starting lineup.

In the first half of 2006–07 Bundesliga season, Bayern's leadership publicly stated its impatience with Dos Santos' progress. Club coach Felix Magath said: "It is clear that Julio's development does not please us, It does not make sense to keep a player at the club who does not create". This led to widespread rumours of his departure from the club; the speculation ended in December 2006, when Bayern announced they had reached a deal to send the player on loan to fellow Bundesliga side VfL Wolfsburg for the remainder of the season. Having failed to break into Wolfsburg's first team (mainly due to a major injury), he returned to Bayern in June.

At the conclusion of the 2006–07 season, Dos Santos had made four league appearances, as well as one appearance in the 2006–07 DFB-Pokal and two appearances in the 2006–07 UEFA Champions League.

However, after the arrivals of Franck Ribéry, Hamit Altıntop, José Sosa and Zé Roberto, it soon became clear that he would again struggle to find a place in the first team. Ottmar Hitzfeld, who had replaced Magath as Bayern manager by that time, stated that the club sought to sell dos Santos. Therefore, he would split 2007–08 between UD Almería (with no first-team appearances) and Grêmio Foot-Ball Porto Alegrense.

In June 2008, dos Santos signed with Clube Atlético Paranaense, also from Brazil.

In June 2009, Julio went back to his original club Cerro Porteño to play the 2009 Clausura and Copa Sudamericana.

On 29 December 2014, Julio dos Santos joined Brazilian club Vasco da Gama.

Before signing with Sportivo Luqueño, dos Santos rejected the opportunity to sign with Olimpia Asunción – being Cerro Porteño's rival – thanking however the club's president for interest in him but stating that his Cerro-ism would not permit him to join Olimpia.

International career
A Paraguayan international since 2004, dos Santos appeared for the nation at the 2006 FIFA World Cup in two matches, assisting for the first goal against Trinidad and Tobago (2–0). He played the 2007 Copa America but has not been called up for the World Cup Qualifiers.

See also
 Players and Records in Paraguayan Football

References

External links
 
 
 
 

1983 births
Living people
Paraguayan people of Spanish descent
Sportspeople from Asunción
Association football midfielders
Paraguayan footballers
Paraguayan Primera División players
Cerro Porteño players
Club Presidente Hayes footballers
Bundesliga players
FC Bayern Munich II players
FC Bayern Munich footballers
VfL Wolfsburg players
UD Almería players
Campeonato Brasileiro Série A players
Grêmio Foot-Ball Porto Alegrense players
Club Athletico Paranaense players
CR Vasco da Gama players
Sportivo Luqueño players
Paraguay under-20 international footballers
Paraguay international footballers
2004 Copa América players
2006 FIFA World Cup players
Paraguayan expatriate footballers
Expatriate footballers in Brazil
Expatriate footballers in Germany
Paraguayan expatriate sportspeople in Brazil
Paraguayan expatriate sportspeople in Germany